The M-3DI Standard, announced by Panasonic Corporation together with XpanD 3D in March 2011, aims to provide industry-wide compatibility and standardisation of LC (Active) Shutter Glasses hardware between manufacturers.

This movement aims to bring about compatibility among manufacturers of 3D TV, computer, notebook, home projection, and cinema with standardised LC (Active) Shutter Glasses that will work across all 3D hardware seamlessly, with the hope of further increasing uptake of 3D products by consumers.

The M-3DI Standard will also feature a comprehensive quality control and testing specification to apply during the production of 3D LC Shutter Glasses; This specification is yet to be finalised and published.

Industry Support 
Various leading 3D technology providers for televisions, projectors and cinemas have agreed to participate in supporting the new standard.

Current providers include:
Panasonic Corporation
XpanD 3D
Hitachi Consumer Electronics Co., Ltd.
Changhong Electric Co., Ltd.
FUNAI Electric Co., Ltd.
Hisense Electric Co., Ltd.
Mitsubishi Electric Corporation
Seiko Epson Corporation
SIM2 Multimedia S.p.A.
ViewSonic Corporation.

Notes

External links 

3D imaging